Michael Peter Pelletier is an American diplomat who served as the United States Ambassador to Madagascar & Comoros from 2019 to 2021.

Early life and education 

Pelletier was raised in Maine. He earned a B.S.F.S. from Georgetown University, a Certificat d’Etudes Politiques from Institut d’Etudes Politiques, Paris, France, and a Master of International Affairs from Columbia University.

Career 

Pelletier, a career member of the Senior Foreign Service, class of Minister-Counselor, has served as an American diplomat since 1987. He has served at eight United States Missions overseas and in senior leadership positions at the United States Department of State, including as Deputy Chief of Mission at the United States embassy in New Delhi, India, and Deputy Assistant Secretary in the Bureau of African Affairs.

From 2016 to 2019, he was the Dean of the School of Professional and Area Studies at the Foreign Service Institute.

He is the recipient of thirteen senior State Department awards, including a Presidential Meritorious Service Award and the Linguist of the Year.

On August 13, 2018, President Donald Trump announced his intent to nominate Pelletier to be the next Ambassador to Madagascar and Comoros. On January 2, 2019, his nomination was confirmed by the United States Senate. He presented his credentials to President Andry Rajoelina on March 5, 2019 and to President Azali Assoumani on June 24, 2019.

In 2021 Pelletier was appointed as the Executive Director of the Institute for Global Engagement at the University of Houston.

References

Living people
20th-century American diplomats
21st-century American diplomats
Ambassadors of the United States to Madagascar
Ambassadors of the United States to the Comoros
School of International and Public Affairs, Columbia University alumni
Georgetown University alumni
United States Assistant Secretaries of State
Year of birth missing (living people)